Kanok Ratwongsakul (nickname: Jing–จิ้ง) is well-known Thai journalist, now he served as Senior Vice President of the Nation Multimedia Group (NMG).

Biography
Ratwongsakul was born on November 4, 1963 in Thai-Chinese poor family in Bangkok's Yotse neighbourhood. He attended elementary at Wat Phra Phiren School in Khlong Thom neighbourhood. Later on, his family moved to the Thonburi's Samre, due to was evicted from the area. He graduated from Wat Rangbua School in Phasi Charoen, and graduated with Bachelor of Communication Arts from Thammasat University.

He started working as a freelance radio host. Later on, he worked as a radio host with Suthichai Yoon, who is founder of NMG, including worked as a TV host in pair with Sorayuth Suthassanachinda between 2000–03. Currently, he is main news anchor of Nation TV along with Theera Thanyapaiboon.

Personal life
He liked to cut news stories in newspapers and collect them since childhood, and love to watch movies. He is currently married but has no children.

For football, Ratwongsakul is a supporter of Everton FC, Bayern Munich and the Germany national football team.

References

1963 births
Living people
Kanok Ratwongsakul
Kanok Ratwongsakul
Kanok Ratwongsakul
Kanok Ratwongsakul
Kanok Ratwongsakul
Kanok Ratwongsakul
Kanok Ratwongsakul